Khaf (also Romanized as Khvāf and Khāf; also known as Qaşabeh-ye Rūd, Rūd, Rūi Khāf, and Rūy) is a city and capital of Khaf County, in Razavi Khorasan Province, Iran. At the 2006 census, its population was 21,160, in 4,924 families. It is situated on being constructed  Mashhad-Herat railway.

References 

Cities in Razavi Khorasan Province

Khaf County